The Kwacha (ISO 4217 code: ZMW) is the currency of Zambia. It is subdivided into 100 Ngwee.

Etymology 
The name kwacha derives from the Nyanja, Bemba, and Tonga language word for "dawn", alluding to the Zambian nationalist slogan of a "new dawn of freedom". The name ngwee translates as "bright" in the Nyanja language.

History 
Prior to independence in 1964, the Rhodesia and Nyasaland pound was the legal tender of the short-lived British protectorate of Northern Rhodesia. After independence, the Bank of Zambia issued the first Zambian currency, the Zambian pound, in 1964. The issued paper bills and coins were of similar denominations as these used before independence, except for the 10 pounds note, which was never issued by the Bank of Zambia. A new design to depict the newly independent country's history and struggle was adopted. The two currencies – the Rhodesia and Nyasaland pound and the Zambian pound, were allowed to circulate in parallel until December 15, 1965, when the South Rhodesian pound bills and coins were withdrawn from circulation, except for the 3 pence coin which was allowed to circulate alongside its Zambian alternative for a brief period.

On July 1, 1966, the parliament approved the arrangements of the decimal currency system (Act 40 of 1966), changing the main currency unit to Kwacha, with one kwacha being equal to 100 ngwee. The exchange rate was set to one kwacha equivalent to ten Zambian shillings, or one half of a Zambian pound. Thus, by January 16, 1968, all Zambian pound notes and coins were removed from circulation and replaced by the new kwacha notes, and ngwee coins. The Zambian pound notes of 10 shillings, 1, and 5 pounds were changed into 1, 2 and 10 kwacha respectively, a note of 50 ngwee was issued to replace the old 5 shillings coin, alongside a new note of 20 kwacha. Ngwee coins with the denominations of 1, 2, 5, 10, and 20 ngwee replacing the existing 1, 3, 6 pence, 1, and 2 shillings coins respectively. The Zambian pound notes, and coins ceased to be a legal tender on January 31, 1974.

At the very beginning, the kwacha was pegged to the pound sterling at a fixed rate of 1.7094 kwacha per 1 pound. Yet, after the devaluation of the US dollar on August 15, 1971, Zambia broke all its currency's ties to the British monetary unit, and pegged the kwacha to the American monetary unit. These reforms resulted in a reduction of the kwacha's gold standard by 7.8%. A few months later, the British Chancellor of the Exchequer Anthony Barber, announced the demise of the Sterling area, and flotation of the sterling pound, causing Zambia to renounce the monetary privileges once enjoyed as a member state.

Throughout the years, the Zambian currency suffered high inflation, forcing the Bank of Zambia to introduce high value denominations in 2003, including 20,000 and 50,000 kwacha bills to facilitate transactions. In 2013, a new, redenominated kwacha was introduced. The value of Zambian currency dropped following redenomination; the exchange rate was 22 kwacha to one U.S. dollar in April 2021. After the 2021 Zambian general election saw a defeat for Edgar Lungu, the currency's depreciation was reversed;  one U.S. dollar was exchanged for about 16 kwacha.

From 22 January 2022 to 1 September 2022, the Zambian kwacha was the best performing currency in the world against the United States dollar, rallying over 18.5%.

Coins 

In 1968, bronze 1 and 2 ngwee and cupro-nickel 5, 10 and 20 ngwee were introduced. These coins all depicted president Kenneth Kaunda on the obverse and flora and fauna on the reverse.  A twelve sided 50 ngwee coin was introduced in 1979 to replace the 50 ngwee note and featured commemorative FAO themes.

(click for image).

In 1982, copper-clad-steel replaced bronze in the 1 and 2 ngwee. These two were struck until 1983, with production of the 5 and 10 ngwee ceasing in 1987 and that of the 20 ngwee in 1988. Nickel-brass 1 kwacha coins were introduced in 1989 and depicted "Bank of Zambia" on the edges. The period of circulation for this coin was brief as inflation rates skyrocketed.

In 1992, a new, smaller coinage was introduced consisting of nickel-plated-steel 25 and 50 ngwee and brass 1, 5 and 10 kwacha. The coins depict the national crest on the obverse and native fauna on the reverse. The coins were issued only one year and then discontinued as the economic crisis dragged on.

All these coins, both from the older and newer series still remain legal tender. However, the value of the metal in the coins is worth more than their irrelevant face value, so they are never seen or used in normal trade. The only place coins might be seen today is when they are sold as souvenirs to tourists.

On January 1, 2013, new coins were introduced, namely for 5, 10, 50 ngwee and 1 kwacha.

Coins of the new kwacha (2013 series)

Banknotes 
The Zambian kwacha was first issued in 1968 to replace the Zambian pound. The design of the kwacha bill changed as time went on, also, different bills were either introduced in or withdrawn from circulation. Seven emissions of the first kwacha are known to exist, while only one emission of the second kwacha was introduced in circulation on January 1, 2013, and still existing since then without any changes in design or security features. Each emission share similar general features in design throughout all the banknotes, with slight changes concerning the colors and the activity based theme on the reverse of the banknotes.

First kwacha (1968–2012)

First issue (1968) 
The first issue of the first kwacha was issued in 1968. The series comprised five banknotes of 50 ngwee, 1, 2, 10, and 20 kwacha. The obverse of the five banknotes featured a portrait of president Kenneth Kaunda in tribal outfit on the right, together with the Coat of Arms of Zambia on the left on the 50 ngwee banknote, or at upper center on the kwacha banknotes. The reverse showed different activity based themes reflecting life in Zambia. The banknotes were printed by Thomas De La Rue & Co. Limited, and bore the signature of Dr Justin B. Zulu, Bank of Zambia's second governor. Apart from the 50 ngwee banknote, the kwacha banknotes had president Kenneth Kaunda as a watermark. Specimen banknotes were issued for each denomination, with the word SPECIMEN overprint in red sans on both the obverse and reverse.

1 First Issued, refers to the year of first issue of the actual banknote from the same emission.
2 Last Issued: refers to the year of last issue of the actual banknote from the same emission.

Second emission (1969–1973) 
In 1969, a second emission of the Zambian kwacha was issued. Initially, the emission comprised the same five banknotes of the first emission, and all five denominations bore the signatures of Dr Justin B. Zulu, Mr Valentine S. Musakanya, and that of Mr Bitwell R. Kuwani, the second, third, and forth governors of the Bank of Zambia, respectively, except for the 50 ngwee bills that never existed with Dr Zulu's signature, as well as the 1 kwacha bills that never showed Mr Kuwani's signature. The second emission banknotes were exactly similar to these of the first emission, except for a slight difference, in which the dot (•) between the currency symbol and the face value was removed. The banknotes were printed by Thomas De La Rue & Co. Limited, and specimen banknotes were issued for each denomination, with the word SPECIMEN overprint in red sans on both the obverse and reverse.

1 First Issued, refers to the year of first issue of the actual banknote from the same emission.
2 Last Issued: refers to the year of last issue of the actual banknote from the same emission.

During the second emission period, a commemorative banknote of 1 kwacha was issued in celebration of the declaration of One-party state on December 13, 1972. The banknote was not a legal tender, and had a different frame design than the banknotes of both, the first and second issues.

Later on in 1973, the Bank of Zambia issued the 5 kwacha banknote for the first time. A red-violet on multicolour underprint design was chosen for the new bill note. The new design resulted in a lot of confusion between the existing 50 ngwee bill and the new 5 kwacha one. This urged the Bank of Zambia to adopt a new design for the 50 ngwee banknotes in 1973. A new black and lilac on multicolor underprint was used for easy recognition, nevertheless, this was the last issue of the 50 ngwee banknotes as it was replaced later by a coin. The two new banknotes bore the signature of Mr Bitwell R. Kuwani, and were printed by Thomas De La Rue & Co. Limited. Specimen banknotes were issued for both denominations, with the word SPECIMEN overprint in red sans on both the obverse and reverse.

1 First Issued, refers to the year of first issue of the actual banknote from the same emission.
2 Last Issued: refers to the year of last issue of the actual banknote from the same emission.

Third issue (1974–1976) 
Prior to the third issue, short-lived designs of the obverses of the 10 and 20 kwacha banknotes were introduced. The new banknotes were printed by the English engraving, and printing company Bradbury, Wilkinson & Co. The new designs featured an older portrait of president Kenneth Kaunda, without the usual frame design, and bearing the signature of Mr Bitwell R. Kuwani. Specimen banknotes were issued for both banknotes, with the word SPECIMEN overprint in red sans on both the obverse and reverse. Thanks to their scarcity, both bills are the most expensive banknotes of the Zambian collection among notaphilists.

1 First Issued, refers to the year of first issue of the actual banknote from the same emission.
2 Last Issued: refers to the year of last issue of the actual banknote from the same emission.

In 1976, a four bills third issue was issued, in which the old frame design was re-adopted once again. Banknotes with all denominations were reproduced, except for the twenty kwacha bill, which was never issued in spite of being redesigned. All bills bore the signatures of Mr Luke J. Mwananshiku, the fifth governors of the Bank of Zambia, except for the two kwacha banknotes, which retained the signature of Mr Bitwell R. Kuwani. The third emission banknotes were exactly similar to these of the second emission, except for president Kenneth Kaunda's portrait, where an older portrait replaced the younger portrait appearing on the first, and second emissions. The banknotes were once again printed by Thomas De La Rue & Co. Limited, and specimen banknotes were issued for each denomination, with the word SPECIMEN overprint in red sans on both the obverse and reverse.

1 First Issued, refers to the year of first issue of the actual banknote from the same emission.
2 Last Issued: refers to the year of last issue of the actual banknote from the same emission.

Until 1991, all Zambian banknotes featured a portrait of President Kenneth Kaunda on the obverse. After 1992, all notes have instead featured a fish eagle on the obverse. After 1989, all the reverses featured the Chainbreaker statue. In 2003, Zambia became the first African country to issue polymer banknotes. The 500 and 1000 kwacha were both printed on polymer. Although the old 20 kwacha note was still in circulation until 2012, such is the rarity of this note that most major retailers rounded prices up to the nearest 50 kwacha when calculating a total. Most items in major supermarkets were displayed using 20 kwacha in the value (e.g., 1980 kwacha).

New Kwacha (2012 series) 
On January 23, 2012, the Bank of Zambia proposed certain measures in regards of the redenomination of the Zambian kwacha. Such recommendations were initially approved by the government, being one of the measures required to address costs associated with the continuous devaluation of the national currency, due to depreciation throughout time, as a direct result of several years of high inflation rates that characterized the national economy during the late decades of the 20th century, and the early years of the 21st century. The recommendations were assented to the parliament on November 3, 2012. Later, The Re-Domination of Currency Act (Act 8 of 2012) was enacted on December 3, 2012.

The old currency unit was divided by 1000, hence, removing three zeros from the preexisting K50,000, K20,000, K10,000, K5,000, and K1,000. The lower denominations of K500, K100, and K50 were also divided by 1000 and were changed into the 1 Kwacha, 50, 10, and 5 Ngwee coins respectively. On the other hand, the preexisting K20 banknote was removed from circulation due to its extremely low purchasing power.

The Bank of Zambia announced January 1, 2013, as the changeover date. On the same day, the new redenominated currency became the legal tender of Zambia. The old and new currencies were allowed to circulate side by side for a transition period of six months, until June 30, 2013. During this period, the old currency was denoted by 'K', whilst the new one was denoted by 'KR'. After the six-month period, the 'KR' symbol was dropped, and the new currency was referred to by the 'K' symbol.

By June 26, 2013, the Bank of Zambia managed to withdraw 3.7 trillion Kwacha in old banknotes, accumulating to about 95.3% of the circulating banknotes. Although the old currency ceased to be legal tender four days later, the Bank of Zambia Deputy Governor, announced that residents who were still holding to the old currency, especially those living in rural areas, could still be able to exchange the old currency for the new one through commercial banks, and other designated agents.

Design 
While being the first African country to introduce polymer banknotes in 2003, the new currency banknotes are all printed on paper, with advanced security features. The six newly issued banknotes share multiple common features on both the obverse and reverse, together with few different features, that are unique for each banknote. All banknotes have the same height of 70 mm, the 2 Kwacha, and 5 Kwacha banknotes are 170 mm wide, whilst the rest of the banknotes are 145 mm wide. All new banknotes were printed by the German printing company G&D, except for the 2015 issue of the 100 Kwacha banknote, which was printed by the Dutch Royal Joh. Enschedé.
Obverse

The obverse of the new currency features four common features, found on the obverse of all the six banknotes, and a single unique feature for each one of them. The common features are: the African fish eagle which considered, by far, the primary recognition feature on all the Zambian banknotes, together with the coat of arms, the signature of the Bank of Zambia Governor and obligation to pay the sum indicated on the banknote, and the face value of the specified banknote. Each banknote features a unique indigenous tree from the abundant forests covering the country.
Reverse

The reverse features the Freedom Statue in Lusaka, the issuing authority of legal tenders in Zambia, Bank of Zambia, in the middle at the top, the face value of the banknote in words in the lower left corner, and in numerals in the other three corners. There is also a unique depiction of wildlife in Zambia, together with an activity based theme on each reverse of the six banknotes.

Security features 
Multiple security features were applied to avoid counterfeit banknotes. Anti-counterfeiting measures used included holograms, multi-colored bills, embedded devices such as strips, microprinting, watermarks and different types of optically variable inks, and the use of design features which prevent counterfeiting by photocopying or scanning.

Commemorative banknotes 
Since its inauguration in 1964 and until the second half of 2016, the Bank of Zambia had issued two commemorative banknotes. The first commemorative banknote was a One Kwacha banknote issued in 1973, commemorating the birth of the second republic, an incident in which the regime, led by president Kenneth Kaunda, decided on December 13, 1972, to set up a One-party state as from January 1, 1973. Apart from the issued note, a specimen banknote was also issued in celebration of the same occasion.

On October 23, 2014, one day before the celebrations of the independence day, the Bank of Zambia revealed its second ever commemorative banknote. A Fifty Kwacha banknote was issued commemorating the 50th Independence Anniversary. Unlike the previous commemorative banknotes and coins of Zambia, the new commemorative banknote was the first commemorative banknote allowed in circulation as a legal tender in the country, bearing the same features of the existing Fifty Kwacha bills.

Exchange Rates 
 As of 14 March, 2023 1 US$ buys 20.3 kwachas.

Historical Exchange Rates 

*Running Average as of 13 January 2023

See also 
 Kwacha
 Malawian kwacha
 Economy of Zambia

References

Further reading

External links 
 Zambia Coins Catalog
 Online catalog and extensive information on Zambian paper money issues since 1963 from colnect.com 
 Online catalog and extensive information on Zambian coinage since 1964 from colnect.com
 The banknotes of Zambia 

Circulating currencies
Currencies of Africa
Currencies of the Commonwealth of Nations
Currencies of Zambia
Currencies introduced in 1968